Angiolipoma is a subcutaneous nodule with vascular structure, having all other features of a typical lipoma. They are commonly painful.

Pathology

Histopathology

Diagnosis

Differential diagnosis 
 Kaposi sarcoma
 Angiosarcoma

See also
 Lipoma
 Skin lesion
 List of cutaneous conditions

References

External links 

Dermal and subcutaneous growths